Child Development Perspectives is a quarterly peer-reviewed academic journal published by Wiley-Blackwell on behalf of the Society for Research in Child Development. Its editor-in-chief is Rob Kail. The journal aims to publish short articles on emerging subjects of inquiry in developmental science. According to the Journal Citation Reports, the journal has a 2016 impact factor of 3.911, ranking it 8th out of 70 journals in the category "Psychology, Developmental".

References

External links 
 

Wiley-Blackwell academic journals
English-language journals
Quarterly journals
Developmental psychology journals
Publications established in 2007